The Chemnitz Küchwald/Abzw Chemnitz-Furth–Chemnitz-Hilbersdorf railway used to be two short freight lines on which freight trains from Geithain and Leipzig, from Wechselburg and from Obergrüna (KCCh branching off at Chemnitz Küchwald) as well as from Riesa and Döbeln (RCCh branching off at Chemnitz-Furth) could bypass Chemnitz main station and get directly to Chemnitz-Hilbersdorf goods station.

History
Both lines were opened on 2 June 1902 along with the Chemnitz-Hilbersdorf goods station. The RCCh line was double-tracked between Abzw Chemnitz-Furth and Chemnitz-Hilbersdorf Stw 5 from 1902 until 1945.

The Hilbersdorf goods station was closed on 1 January 1999, so that traffic on both lines was discontinued on 31 August 1999. The tracks were dismantled some years later (e.g. 2002 the junctions in Furth). In spring 2009, the Raw-Bridge was demolished; the Chemnitz valley viaduct does still exist today.

Route
The KCCh line left Chemnitz Küchwald railway station (until December 2018 Küchwald freight yard) across the Chemnitz valley viaduct and united, after it crossed the disused tunnel to the formerly planned mail station, with the RCCh line, which came from Abzw Chemnitz-Furth on the Riesa–Chemnitz railway and did also cross the "post track tunnel" and some bridges before. The united line continued to the Werkstättenviadukt ("Workshops viaduct", also called "Raw-Bridge") and merged at signal box 5 into the Chemnitz-Hilbersdorf station.

References

Railway lines in Saxony
Transport in Chemnitz
Railway lines opened in 1902
Railway lines closed in 1999